E 532 is a European B class road in connecting the cities Memmingen, Germany – Telfs, Austria.

Route and E-road junctions 
  (on shared signage )
Memmingen:  , 
Füssen (near Austrian border)
  (on shared signage  then )
Reutte (near German border)
Telfs:

External links 
 UN Economic Commission for Europe: Overall Map of E-road Network (2007)
 International E-road network

International E-road network
532
Roads in Austria